NSS Training College, Pandalam was established in 1957 and managed by Nair Service Society. It was founded by Bharatha Kesari Mannath Padmanabhan and is situated at Pandalam, Kerala, India, affiliated to Kerala University.

Recognition and Accreditation
The institution is recognized by National Council for Teacher Education.

Courses

 B Ed programme
 M Ed programme

References

Teacher education in India
Teacher training programs